The Battle of Dalushan (Greater Deer Mountain) Islands (大鹿山等岛战斗) was a battle fought between the nationalists and the communists for several islands and islets just off the coast of Zhejiang, China during aftermath of the Chinese Civil War in the post-World War II era; it resulted in a communist victory.

On May 29, 1953, a battalion of the 179th regiment of the 60th Division and two companies of the 17th Public Security Division launched their assault on Da Lu Shan Dao (大鹿山岛, "Greater Deer Mountain Island"), Xiao Lu Shan Dao, (小鹿山岛, "Lesser Deer Mountain Island"), Ji Guan Shan Dao (鸡冠山岛, "Rooster’s Crown Mountain Island"), and Yang Yu (羊屿, "Goat Islet") off coast of Zhejiang.  At 6:00 PM, People's Liberation Army artillery bombarded Ji Guan Shan Dao and Yang Yu from Zhaitoujiao (寨头角) and Kanmen (坎门) on the mainland.  At 7:00 PM, the first assault wave successfully landed on the two islets. Afterward, naval gunboats approached Da Lu Shan Dao and Xiao Lu Shan Dao and bombarded the nationalist positions on the islands.  At 9:00 PM, the battle ended with 53 nationalists killed and 186 captured, including the commander of the 42nd Column of the Anti-Communist Assault Army, He Zhuoquan (何卓权). The nationalists also lost two junks, and eight radio sets along with code books.

The communist victory ensured further isolation of the nationalist strongholds along the coast of Zhejiang, such as Dachen Archipelago and Yijiangshan Islands, and another nationalist threat to the communists' coastal sea lines of communication was eliminated.  As for the nationalists, these islands and islets were simply too small to station the large number of troops required for any effective defense.  They were also too far away from the nearest nationalist strongholds along the coast, so it was impossible to reinforce the local garrison in time.

See also
List of battles of the Chinese Civil War
National Revolutionary Army
History of the People's Liberation Army
Chinese Civil War

References

Zhu, Zongzhen and Wang, Chaoguang, Liberation War History, 1st Edition, Social Scientific Literary Publishing House in Beijing, 2000,  (set)
Zhang, Ping, History of the Liberation War, 1st Edition, Chinese Youth Publishing House in Beijing, 1987,  (pbk.)
Jie, Lifu, Records of the Liberation War: The Decisive Battle of Two Kinds of Fates, 1st Edition, Hebei People's Publishing House in Shijiazhuang, 1990,  (set)
Literary and Historical Research Committee of the Anhui Committee of the Chinese People's Political Consultative Conference, Liberation War, 1st Edition, Anhui People's Publishing House in Hefei, 1987, 
Li, Zuomin, Heroic Division and Iron Horse: Records of the Liberation War, 1st Edition, Chinese Communist Party History Publishing House in Beijing, 2004, 
Wang, Xingsheng, and Zhang, Jingshan, Chinese Liberation War, 1st Edition, People's Liberation Army Literature and Art Publishing House in Beijing, 2001,  (set)
Huang, Youlan, History of the Chinese People's Liberation War, 1st Edition, Archives Publishing House in Beijing, 1992, 
Liu Wusheng, From Yan'an to Beijing: A Collection of Military Records and Research Publications of Important Campaigns in the Liberation War, 1st Edition, Central Literary Publishing House in Beijing, 1993, 
Tang, Yilu and Bi, Jianzhong, History of Chinese People's Liberation Army in Chinese Liberation War, 1st Edition, Military Scientific Publishing House in Beijing, 1993 – 1997,  (Volum 1), 7800219615 (Volum 2), 7800219631 (Volum 3), 7801370937 (Volum 4), and 7801370953 (Volum 5)

Conflicts in 1953
Battles of the Chinese Civil War
1953 in China
Military history of Zhejiang